is a Japanese actress. Her mother was a model. She graduated from Okinawa Prefectural Central High School. She gained recognition as an actress when she was selected in an audition of 2,156 people to star in the NHK Asadora Dondo Hare in 2006.

Filmography

Film

Television

TV movies

TV dramas

Awards
54th Television Drama Academy Awards: Special Award for Dondo Hare

References

External links
 

Japanese actresses
Japanese female models
People from Okinawa Prefecture
1986 births
Living people
Asadora lead actors
Ryukyuan people